The 2006 Vanderbilt Commodores football team represented Vanderbilt University during the 2006 NCAA Division I FBS football season. The team's head coach was Bobby Johnson, who served his fifth year as the Commodores' head coach.  Members of the Southeastern Conference (SEC), the Commodores played their home games at Vanderbilt Stadium at Dudley Field in Nashville, Tennessee.  In 2006, Vanderbilt went 4–8 with a record of 1–7 in the SEC.

Schedule

References

Vanderbilt
Vanderbilt Commodores football seasons
Vanderbilt Commodores football